Cerkljanski Vrh is a dispersed settlement in the hills south of Cerkno in the traditional Littoral region of Slovenia. It includes the hamlets and isolated farms of Bende, Kacin, Krog, Zakrog, Hobovše, Lajše, Mator, Na Ravan, Polanc, Stotnikar, Zakrog, and Za Vrhom.

References

External links

Cerkljanski Vrh on Geopedia

Populated places in the Municipality of Cerkno